This is a list of the bird species recorded in Kiribati an island nation in the central Pacific Ocean. The avifauna of Kiribati include a total of 90 species, of which two are endemic, and 3 have been introduced by humans.

This list's taxonomic treatment (designation and sequence of orders, families and species) and nomenclature (common and scientific names) follow the conventions of The Clements Checklist of Birds of the World, 2022 edition. The family accounts at the beginning of each heading reflect this taxonomy, as do the species counts found in each family account. Introduced and accidental species are included in the total counts for Kiribati.

The following tags have been used to highlight several categories. Not all species fall into one of these categories. Those that do not are commonly occurring native species.

(A) Accidental - a species that rarely or accidentally occurs in Kiribati
(I) Introduced - a species introduced to Kiribati as a consequence, direct or indirect, of human actions
(Ex) Extirpated - a species that no longer occurs in Kiribati although populations exist elsewhere
(E)  Endemic - a species endemic to Kiribati

Ducks, geese, and waterfowl
Order: AnseriformesFamily: Anatidae

Anatidae includes the ducks and most duck-like waterfowl, such as geese and swans. These birds are adapted to an aquatic existence with webbed feet, flattened bills, and feathers that are excellent at shedding water due to an oily coating.

Canada goose, Branta canadensis (A)
Northern shoveler, Spatula clypeata
Gadwall, Mareca strepera (Ex)
Eurasian wigeon, Mareca penelope
American wigeon, Mareca americana (A)
Mallard, Anas platyrhynchos (A)
Northern pintail, Anas acuta
Green-winged teal, Anas crecca

Pheasants, grouse, and allies 
Order: GalliformesFamily: Phasianidae

The Phasianidae are a family of terrestrial birds which consists of quails, partridges, snowcocks, francolins, spurfowls, tragopans, monals, pheasants, peafowls, grouse, ptarmigan, and junglefowls. In general, they are plump (although they vary in size) and have broad, relatively short wings.

Red junglefowl, Gallus gallus (I)

Pigeons and doves
Order: ColumbiformesFamily: Columbidae

Pigeons and doves are stout-bodied birds with short necks and short slender bills with a fleshy cere.

Rock pigeon, Columba livia
Shy ground dove, Gallicolumba stairi
Pacific imperial-pigeon, Ducula pacifica
Micronesian imperial-pigeon, Ducula oceanica (Ex)

Cuckoos
Order: CuculiformesFamily: Cuculidae

The family Cuculidae includes cuckoos, roadrunners and anis. These birds are of variable size with slender bodies, long tails and strong legs. The Old World cuckoos are brood parasites.

Long-tailed koel, Urodynamis taitensis

Rails, gallinules, and coots
Order: GruiformesFamily: Rallidae

Rallidae is a large family of small to medium-sized birds which includes the rails, crakes, coots and gallinules. Typically they inhabit dense vegetation in damp environments near lakes, swamps or rivers. In general they are shy and secretive birds, making them difficult to observe. Most species have strong legs and long toes which are well adapted to soft uneven surfaces. They tend to have short, rounded wings and to be weak fliers.

Spotless crake, 	Zapornia tabuensis

Plovers and lapwings
Order: CharadriiformesFamily: Charadriidae

The family Charadriidae includes the plovers, dotterels and lapwings. They are small to medium-sized birds with compact bodies, short, thick necks and long, usually pointed, wings. They are found in open country worldwide, mostly in habitats near water. 

Black-bellied plover, Pluvialis squatarola
Pacific golden-plover, Pluvialis fulva

Sandpipers and allies
Order: CharadriiformesFamily: Scolopacidae

Scolopacidae is a large diverse family of small to medium-sized shorebirds including the sandpipers, curlews, godwits, shanks, tattlers, woodcocks, snipes, dowitchers and phalaropes. The majority of these species eat small invertebrates picked out of the mud or soil. Variation in length of legs and bills enables multiple species to feed in the same habitat, particularly on the coast, without direct competition for food.

Bristle-thighed curlew, Numenius tahitiensis
Whimbrel, Numenius phaeopus
Bar-tailed godwit, Limosa lapponica
Black-tailed godwit, Limosa limosa
Ruddy turnstone, Arenaria interpres
Kiritimati sandpiper, Prosobonia cancellata (Ex)
Sharp-tailed sandpiper, Calidris acuminata
Sanderling, Calidris alba
Pectoral sandpiper, Calidris melanotos
Red phalarope, Phalaropus fulicarius
Common sandpiper, Actitis hypoleucos
Gray-tailed tattler, Tringa brevipes
Wandering tattler, Tringa incana

Skuas and jaegers
Order: CharadriiformesFamily: Stercorariidae

The family Stercorariidae are, in general, medium to large birds, typically with grey or brown plumage, often with white markings on the wings. They nest on the ground in temperate and arctic regions and are long-distance migrants.

South polar skua, Stercorarius maccormicki
Brown skua, Stercorarius antarcticus
Pomarine jaeger, Stercorarius pomarinus
Long-tailed jaeger, Stercorarius longicaudus

Gulls, terns, and skimmers
Order: CharadriiformesFamily: Laridae

Laridae is a family of medium to large seabirds, the gulls, terns, and skimmers. Gulls are typically grey or white, often with black markings on the head or wings. They have stout, longish bills and webbed feet. Terns are a group of generally medium to large seabirds typically with grey or white plumage, often with black markings on the head. Most terns hunt fish by diving but some pick insects off the surface of fresh water. Terns are generally long-lived birds, with several species known to live in excess of 30 years.

Laughing gull, Leucophaeus atricilla
Franklin's gull, Leucophaeus pipixcan (A)
Ring-billed gull, Larus delawarensis
Glaucous-winged gull, Larus glaucescens (A)
Kelp gull, Larus dominicanus (A)
Brown noddy, Anous stolidus
Black noddy, Anous minutus
Lesser noddy, Anous tenuirostris
Blue-gray noddy, Anous ceruleus
White tern, Gygis alba
Sooty tern, Onychoprion fuscatus
Gray-backed tern, Onychoprion lunatus
Little tern, Sternula albifrons
Black-naped tern, Sterna sumatrana
Great crested tern, Thalasseus bergii

Tropicbirds
Order: PhaethontiformesFamily: Phaethontidae

Tropicbirds are slender white birds of tropical oceans, with exceptionally long central tail feathers. Their heads and long wings have black markings. 

White-tailed tropicbird, Phaethon lepturus
Red-tailed tropicbird, Phaethon rubricauda

Albatrosses
Order: ProcellariiformesFamily: Diomedeidae

The albatrosses are among the largest of flying birds, and the great albatrosses from the genus Diomedea have the largest wingspans of any extant birds.

Laysan albatross, Phoebastria immutabilis

Southern storm-petrels
Order: ProcellariiformesFamily: Oceanitidae

The southern storm-petrels are relatives of the petrels and are the smallest seabirds. They feed on planktonic crustaceans and small fish picked from the surface, typically while hovering. The flight is fluttering and sometimes bat-like.

Wilson's storm-petrel, Oceanites oceanicus
White-faced storm-petrel, Pelagodroma marina
Polynesian storm-petrel, Nesofregetta fuliginosa

Northern storm-petrels
Order: ProcellariiformesFamily: Hydrobatidae

Though the members of this family are similar in many respects to the southern storm-petrels, including their general appearance and habits, there are enough genetic differences to warrant their placement in a separate family. 

Leach's storm-petrel, Hydrobates leucorhous
Band-rumped storm-petrel, Hydrobates castro

Shearwaters and petrels
Order: ProcellariiformesFamily: Procellariidae

The procellariids are the main group of medium-sized "true petrels", characterised by united nostrils with medium septum and a long outer functional primary.

Kermadec petrel, Pterodroma neglecta
Providence petrel, Pterodroma solandri
Mottled petrel, Pterodroma inexpectata (A)
Juan Fernandez petrel, Pterodroma externa
Hawaiian petrel, Pterodroma sandwichensis
White-necked petrel, Pterodroma cervicalis (A)
Bonin petrel, Pterodroma hypoleuca
Black-winged petrel, Pterodroma nigripennis (A)
Cook's petrel, Pterodroma cookii
Collared petrel, Pterodroma brevipes (A)
Stejneger's petrel, Pterodroma longirostris
Pycroft's petrel, Pterodroma pycrofti (A)
Phoenix petrel, Pterodroma alba
Bulwer's petrel, Bulweria bulwerii
Tahiti petrel, Pseudobulweria rostrata (A)
Streaked shearwater, Calonectris leucomelas (A)
Pink-footed shearwater, Ardenna creatopus
Flesh-footed shearwater, Ardenna carneipes
Wedge-tailed shearwater, Ardenna pacificus
Buller's shearwater, Ardenna bulleri
Sooty shearwater, Ardenna griseus
Short-tailed shearwater, Ardenna tenuirostris
Christmas shearwater, Puffinus nativitatis
Tropical shearwater, Puffinus bailloni

Frigatebirds
Order: SuliformesFamily: Fregatidae

Frigatebirds are large seabirds usually found over tropical oceans. They are large, black and white or completely black, with long wings and deeply forked tails. The males have coloured inflatable throat pouches. They do not swim or walk and cannot take off from a flat surface. Having the largest wingspan-to-body-weight ratio of any bird, they are essentially aerial, able to stay aloft for more than a week.

Lesser frigatebird, Fregata ariel
Great frigatebird, Fregata minor

Boobies and gannets
Order: SuliformesFamily: Sulidae

The sulids comprise the gannets and boobies. Both groups are medium to large coastal seabirds that plunge-dive for fish.

Masked booby, Sula dactylatra
Nazca booby, Sula granti (A)
Brown booby, Sula leucogaster
Red-footed booby, Sula sula

Herons, egrets, and bitterns
Order: PelecaniformesFamily: Ardeidae

The family Ardeidae contains the bitterns, herons, and egrets. Herons and egrets are medium to large wading birds with long necks and legs. Bitterns tend to be shorter necked and more wary. Members of Ardeidae fly with their necks retracted, unlike other long-necked birds such as storks, ibises and spoonbills.

Pacific reef-heron, Egretta sacra

Old World parrots
Order: PsittaciformesFamily: Psittaculidae

Characteristic features of parrots include a strong curved bill, an upright stance, strong legs, and clawed zygodactyl feet. Many parrots are vividly coloured, and some are multi-coloured. Old World parrots are found from Africa east across south and southeast Asia and Oceania to Australia and New Zealand.

Kuhl's lorikeet, Vini kuhlii (I)

Acrocephalid warblers
Order: PasseriformesFamily: Acrocephalidae

Kiritimati reed warbler, Acrocephalus aequinoctialis (E)

See also
List of birds
Lists of birds by region

References

 

Kiribati
birds
birds
'